Penelope Allen, also known as Penny Allen, is an American stage and film actress and acting coach.  She is best known as the head bank teller being held hostage in the film Dog Day Afternoon. She also played Annie, the wife of Francis Lionel "Lion" Delbuchi in the film Scarecrow.

Filmography

Film

Television

External links
 

20th-century American actresses
21st-century American actresses
Place of birth missing
Place of death missing
Year of birth missing
Year of death missing